Onychogomphus kitchingmani is a species of dragonfly in the family Gomphidae. It is endemic to Zambia.  Its natural habitat is rivers.

References

Fauna of Zambia
Gomphidae
Taxonomy articles created by Polbot
Insects described in 1964